The 2017–18 Basketligaen was the 43rd season of the highest professional basketball tier in Denmark. The season started on 20 September 2017 and ended on 7 May 2018. Bakken Bears was the defending champion, and won the championship again after beating Horsens IC in the play-off finals.

Competition format
In the regular season, teams played against each other four times home-and-away in double a round-robin format. The eight teams advanced to the playoffs.

Teams

Wolfpack returned to the Basketligan after a two-year absence. They replaced SISU, which was the last qualified in the previous season and therefore relegated.

Regular season

Table

Playoffs
The playoffs were played between the eight teams of the competition, with a best-of-five series in a 1-1-1-1-1 format. The seeded team played games 1, 3 and 5 at home. The Finals will be played in a best-of-seven series and the bronze medal series as a single game. The playoffs began on 13 March and ended 7 May 2018.

Bracket

Quarterfinals
The quarter-finals began on 18 March and ended 29 March 2018.

|}

Semifinals

|}

Third place game

Finals

|}

Clubs in European competitions

References

External links
Official Basketligaen website

Basketligaen seasons
Danish
Basketball
Basketball